The Tianjin University of Technology and Education (TUTE) is a public vocational university in Tianjin, China. The university is sponsored by the Ministry of Education and Tianjin Municipal People's Government. 

The university was established in 1979 under the Chinese Ministry of Labour. In 2000, the ministry transferred the majority control of TUTE to the  City of Tianjin. In March 2010, it was renamed Tianjin University of Technology and Education.

In 1993, TUTE began to recruit foreign students. In 2006, TUTE was allowed to enroll students with Chinese Government Scholarship. There were also “Principal Scholarship” to reward excellent overseas students. 

In 2008, TUTE established its International School.  In charge of the enrollment, cultivation, and management of overseas students. It became one of the fastest growing schools in Tianjin for overseas students. During the past few years, TUTE has also cooperated with schools from the United States, Japan, South Korea, Britain, and Australia

References

External links

Universities and colleges in Tianjin